Grift is a drainage canal of North Rhine-Westphalia, Germany. It discharges into the Ponter Dondert near Geldern. It is part of the Fossa Eugeniana, a planned 17th century canal that was to connect the Meuse near Venlo with the Rhine near Rheinberg.

References

Geography of North Rhine-Westphalia
Canals in Germany
CGrift